Jasna  is a village in the administrative district of Gmina Dzierzgoń, within Sztum County, Pomeranian Voivodeship, in northern Poland.

The village has a population of 350.

References 

Jasna